Thunder Mountain is an unincorporated community and census-designated place (CDP) in Santa Fe County, New Mexico, United States. It was first listed as a CDP prior to the 2020 census.

The CDP is in southwestern Santa Fe County. It is bordered to the north and east by the city of Edgewood, to the south by Barton, and to the west by Bernalillo County. Interstate 40 forms the southern border of the CDP, with access from Exit 187 to the east in Edgewood and from Exit 181 to the west in Sedillo. I-40 leads west  to Albuquerque and east  to Santa Rosa.

Demographics

Education 
It is within Moriarty-Edgewood School District.

References 

Census-designated places in Santa Fe County, New Mexico
Census-designated places in New Mexico